The 2002 British Rally Championship season was the 44th season of the British Rally Championship. The season consisted of eight rounds and began on 26 April, with the Pirelli International Rally in the north east of England. The season ended on 27 October, at the  Michelin South of England Tempest Stages. The series was organised by the Royal Scottish Automobile Club.

Entry list

Calendar
 Pirelli International Rally - 26–28 April
 Rally of Wales - 18–19 May
 RSAC Scottish Rally - 7–9 June
 Jim Clark Memorial Rally - 12–13 June
 Manx International Rally - 1–3 August
 The Ulster Rally - 6–7 September
 Trackrod Rally Yorkshire - 28–29 September
 Michelin South of England Tempest Stages - 26–27 October

References

British Rally Championship seasons
Rally Championship
British Rally Championship